Richland Township may refer to the following places in the U.S. state of Michigan:

 Richland Township, Kalamazoo County, Michigan
 Richland Township, Missaukee County, Michigan
 Richland Township, Montcalm County, Michigan
 Richland Township, Ogemaw County, Michigan
 Richland Township, Saginaw County, Michigan

See also 
 Richland, Michigan, Kalamazoo County
 Richland Township (disambiguation)
 Richland (disambiguation)
 Richfield Township, Michigan (disambiguation)
 Richmond Township, Michigan (disambiguation)

Michigan township disambiguation pages